Lamont Roach Jr. (born August 18, 1995) is an American professional boxer who challenged for the WBO super featherweight title in 2019.

Roach was a decorated amateur, winning gold medals at the National Golden Gloves and USA Boxing Youth National Championships in 2013. He made his professional debut the following year, shortly after signing with Golden Boy Promotions, while studying at the University of Maryland. He went undefeated in his first 20 fights (19 wins, 1 draw), collecting three minor belts before he unsuccessfully challenged Jamel Herring for his WBO super featherweight title in 2019.

Early life
Born in Washington, D.C., Roach was raised in Upper Marlboro, Maryland. When he was nine years old, he accompanied his father and his cousin to No “X” Cuse Boxing Club in Capitol Heights, where he got to hit a punching bag for the first time and learn some of the basics of boxing. He enjoyed it so much that he decided to continue training under his father and his cousin Bernard, and by middle school was in the gym five times a week. Although he had also been playing football throughout his youth, he dropped it to focus on boxing once he reached high school.

He won two Junior National Golden Gloves Championships, a national PAL Championship and five Ringside World Championships. He also claimed a bronze medal at the Klitschko Brothers Tournament in Ukraine and was honored with the USA Boxing Outstanding Boxer award for his performances that year.

Professional career
In March 2014, he signed with Golden Boy Promotions to begin his professional career with his father Lamont Sr. serving as his manager. Roach made his professional debut on April 19, 2014, defeating Victor Galindo by unanimous decision at the D.C. Armory. Just 18 years old at the time, he was still a freshman at the University of Maryland studying mechanical engineering, following in his father's footsteps. Two months later, he defeated Miguel Antonio Rodríguez in Boston when his opponent failed to answer the bell for the second round. In his first televised match he faced Herbert Quartey, cousin of former world champion Ike Quartey, in Philadelphia on January 20, 2015. Roach dominated the more experienced fighter, scoring three knockdowns before the fight was stopped in his favor by the referee in the fourth round, extending his winning streak to six.

On January 28, 2017, he stopped Alejandro Valdez inside of two minutes in Indio, California to capture the vacant WBC Youth Silver super featherweight title and move to 13–0. He dedicated the win to his recently-deceased cousin Jermaine, who had accompanied him to his first boxing session more than a decade earlier. He successfully defended the belt against Jesús Valdez five months later, also in Indio. Just days before his next fight, a non-title bout versus Dominican veteran Luis Hinojosa in October, his cousin and life-long trainer Bernard "Boogaloo" Roach died of a heart attack. With his father taking over as his head coach, he went on to beat Hinojosa with a first-round TKO for his third stoppage victory in four fights. A month later Roach headlined his first professional card when he faced Rey Perez at the MGM National Harbor in Maryland, just 20 minutes from his hometown of Upper Marlboro. He defeated the Filipino journeyman by unanimous decision in the 10-round main event of the ESPN Deportes/ESPN2 telecast.

By the beginning of 2018 Roach had a record of 16–0. He was rewarded with an opportunity to challenge for the vacant WBO International super featherweight title, traveling to Puerto Rico to face former world title challenger Orlando Cruz. In what was his first fight outside of the continental United States, he fought Cruz to a controversial split draw in the main event of a Golden Boy Boxing on ESPN card. It was a close fight until the ninth round, when Roach hit the 36-year-old with a left hook to the head that made him stagger and fall, seemingly a knockdown. However, it was ruled a slip by Puerto Rican referee Luis Pabon, a crucial point that would have given him the victory. Three months later he defeated Deivis Julio Bassa for the still-vacant WBO International belt in Cancún, after the Colombian contender stayed in his corner at the conclusion of the sixth round. The victory catapulted him to  5 in the WBO rankings. On December 15, he defeated Alberto Mercado in his first title defense by unanimous decision on the undercard of the Canelo Álvarez–Rocky Fielding world title bout at Madison Square Garden. This further moved him up the WBO rankings to No. 2 in January 2019.

Roach faced veteran Puerto Rican fighter Jonathan Oquendo in a WBO junior lightweight final eliminator during the Álvarez–Daniel Jacobs undercard at T-Mobile Arena in May 2019. He retained his belt while also taking Oquendo's WBO–NABO belt with a unanimous decision victory. On November 9, he faced newly-crowned champion Jamel Herring for his WBO belt, but lost the 12-round bout in Fresno, California by unanimous decision. He was scheduled to face Neil John Tabanao at the Avalon Hollywood on March 19, but the fight was cancelled due to the COVID-19 pandemic.

Roach faced Neil John Tabanao on October 30, 2020, on the Jaime Munguia and Tureano Johnson undercard. He won the fight by a third-round knockout. Roach next faced Daniel Rosas on July 9, 2021. He won the fight by a second-round technical knockout.

Roach was booked to face the former WBA (Regular) super featherweight champion René Alvarado for the WBA-NABA super-featherweight title. The fight was scheduled for the undercard of the Gilberto Ramirez and Yunieski Gonzalez light-heavyweight bout, which took place on December 18, 2021. He won the fight by unanimous decision. Two judges scored the fight 98–92 for Roach, while the third judge awarded him a 100–90 scorecard.

Professional boxing record

References

External links
 

Living people
1995 births
American male boxers
African-American boxers
Super-featherweight boxers
Winners of the United States Championship for amateur boxers
Boxers from Washington, D.C.
Boxers from Maryland
People from Upper Marlboro, Maryland
National Golden Gloves champions
21st-century African-American sportspeople